Jay Gonzalez (born 1973) is a musician from Athens, Georgia known for playing keyboards and guitar in the Drive-By Truckers. Gonzalez joined the band in 2008 and also produces solo music.

He has been in the bands Loveapple in the 1990s, the Possibilities and Nutria in the early 2000s, and also plays in the band Cut Buffer. He is a fan of 70's power pop music which is evidenced in his solo album Mess of Happiness. His 2012 solo album Bitter Suite is five songs that all flow together as one musical composition.

Equipment
Gonzalez plays a 1968 Gibson SG Special with the original P-90s and Vibrola tailpiece. He uses an Ace of Clubs combo amp with two channels—one more British-style, and the other more American—plus reverb. His effects board contains a TC Electronic PolyTune tuner which feeds into an MXR Micro Amp, a modded DOD FX52 Classic Fuzz, and a Xotic EP Booster, with additional effects provided by a TC Electronic Flashback delay and a Boss RT-20 Rotary Ensemble.

Personal life
Gonzalez grew up in Shenorock, New York and started out taking piano lessons as a seven year old, starting guitar at the age of 14. He graduated from Somers High School and  studied at SUNY, Fredonia. He is married to Katey and they have one son.

Discography

Albums

Extended plays

References

External links
 Official website

American rock guitarists
American male guitarists
American singer-songwriters
American rock songwriters
American male singer-songwriters
Living people
Drive-By Truckers members
20th-century American guitarists
20th-century American male musicians
1973 births